The Frigido is a short river in Tuscany, central Italy, whose course of 17 km is entirely included in the province of Massa-Carrara. It starts from two branches, one having its source in the Monte Sagro and Monte Rasore (Apuan Alps), the other near the village of Forno.

After running into a deep valley in the Apuan Alps, it receives the waters of the Renara and Fosso d'Antona, and then flows in Massa before reaching the Tyrrhenian Sea near Marina di Massa.

External links

Rivers of Italy
Rivers of the Province of Massa-Carrara
Drainage basins of the Tyrrhenian Sea